Vasco da Gama (station code: VSG) is a railway station serving the town of Vasco da Gama in Goa, India.

History 
The station was part of Marmagao and Vasco metre-gauge railway line. This was main rail in the state until Konkan Railway was started in 1998.

Jurisdiction 
It comes under the jurisdiction of the Hubli division of the South Western Railway Zone.

References
Vasco Da Gama - VSG

External links

Hubli railway division
Railway stations in South Goa district
Railway terminus in India
Transport in Vasco da Gama, Goa
Buildings and structures in Vasco da Gama, Goa